Roger Hanshaw (born March 24, 1980) is an American politician from West Virginia who currently serves as the Speaker of the West Virginia House of Delegates, in office since August 2018.

West Virginia House of Delegates
Hanshaw was first elected to the West Virginia House of Delegates during the 2014 election cycle, defeating incumbent Democrat David Walker with 54.7% of the vote, to Walker's 45.3%.

References

|-

Living people
Politicians from Charleston, West Virginia
West Virginia University alumni
West Virginia University College of Law alumni
University of Notre Dame alumni
Speakers of the West Virginia House of Delegates
Republican Party members of the West Virginia House of Delegates
21st-century American politicians
1980 births